France 3 Nord-Pas-de-Calais is one France 3's regional services, broadcasting to people in the Nord-Pas-de-Calais region.

The service was founded on 10 April 1950 as RTF Télé-Lille. France 3 Nord-Pas-de-Calais can also be received in Belgium. The service is headquartered in Lille.

Programs
 Brunch
 La voix est libre
 Midi Sports
 Le journal de l'Eurorégion
 En avant la musique
 Goutez-moi ça
 La vie tout simplement
 C'est mieux le matin

News
 19/20 Nord-Pas-de-Calais
 Soir 3 Nord-Pas-de-Calais
 12/13 Nord-Pas-de-Calais

See also
 France 3 Picardie

References

External links 
 Official site 

03 Nord-Pas-de-Calais
Television channels and stations established in 1950
Mass media in Lille